Henry Golding (born 1987) is a British/Malaysian actor. Henry Golding may also refer to:

Henry Golding (died 1576), MP for Colchester and Maldon
Henry Golding (died 1593), MP for Callington

See also

 Henry Gold (disambiguation)
 Henry Goulding House, an historic house in Massachusetts